Maximilian Wittek (born 21 August 1995) is a German professional footballer who plays as a left-back for Eredivisie club Vitesse.

Club career
Wittek is a youth exponent from 1860 Munich. He made his 2. Bundesliga debut on 10 August 2014 against RB Leipzig in a 3–0 home defeat. He played the first half, before being substituted for Marin Tomasov at half-time. Wittek scored his first professional goal on 13 December 2014 in 3–2 defeat against Karlsruhe.

In June 2017, Wittek joined SpVgg Greuther Fürth signing a three-year contract.

International career
On 9 October 2014, Wittek made his debut for Germany U20 in a 0–1 home defeat against England.

Career statistics

References

External links
 

1995 births
Living people
German footballers
Association football defenders
2. Bundesliga players
Regionalliga players
Eredivisie players
TSV 1860 Munich players
TSV 1860 Munich II players
SpVgg Greuther Fürth players
SBV Vitesse players
Germany youth international footballers
People from Freising
Sportspeople from Upper Bavaria
Footballers from Bavaria